The 2002 Yukon general election was held on November 4, 2002 to elect members of the 31st Yukon Legislative Assembly in Yukon, Canada.

Results by party

Results by riding
names in bold indicate party leaders

|-
|bgcolor=whitesmoke|Copperbelt
|| 
|Haakon Arntzen374
|
|Arthur Mitchell312
|
|Lillian Grubach-Hambrook263
|
| 
|
|New district
|-
|bgcolor=whitesmoke|Klondike
|| 
|Peter Jenkins 508
|
|Glen Everitt224
|
|Lisa Hutton200
|
| 
|| 
|Peter Jenkins
|-
|bgcolor=whitesmoke|Kluane
|
|Michael Crawshay124
|
|Paul Birckel109
|| 
|Gary McRobb442
|
| 
|| 
|Gary McRobb 
|-
|bgcolor=whitesmoke|Lake Laberge
|| 
|Brad Cathers466
|
|Pam Buckway218
|
|Bill Commins150
|
| 
|| 
|Pam Buckway
|-
|bgcolor=whitesmoke|McIntyre-Takhini
|| 
|John Edzerza288
|
|Judy Gingell204
|
|Maureen Stephens270
|
|Wayne Jim129 
Geoffrey Capp15
|| 
|Wayne Jim 
|-
|bgcolor=whitesmoke|Mayo-Tatchun
|
|Jerry C. Kruse102
|
|Pat Van Bibber210
|| 
|Eric Fairclough339
|
|Dibs Williams36
|| 
|Eric Fairclough
|-
|bgcolor=whitesmoke|Mount Lorne
|
|Darcy Tkachuk271
|
|Cynthia Tucker 236
|| 
|Steve Cardiff334
|
| 
|| 
|Cynthia Tucker 
|-
|bgcolor=whitesmoke|Pelly-Nisutlin
|| 
|Dean Hassard 297
|
|Jim McLachlan181
|
|Buzz Burgess 162
|
| 
|| 
|Jim McLachlan
|-
|bgcolor=whitesmoke|Porter Creek Centre
|| 
|Archie Lang 399
|
|Scott Kent312
|
|Judi Johnny 63
|
| 
|| 
|Scott Kent
|-
|bgcolor=whitesmoke|Porter Creek North
|| 
|Jim Kenyon331
|
|Dave Austin148
|
|Mark Bowers135
|
|Roger Rondeau112
|| 
|Don Roberts
|-
|bgcolor=whitesmoke|Porter Creek South
|
|Lynn Ogden301
|| 
|Pat Duncan408
|
|Paul Warner 80
|
| 
|| 
|Pat Duncan
|-
|bgcolor=whitesmoke|Riverdale North
|| 
|Ted Staffen 446
|
|Dale Eftoda355
|
|Jan Slipetz 223
|
| 
|| 
|Dale Eftoda
|-
|bgcolor=whitesmoke|Riverdale South
|| 
|Glenn Hart 385
|
|Sue Edelman332
|
|Cary Gryba 253
|
| 
|| 
|Sue Edelman
|-
|bgcolor=whitesmoke|Southern Lakes
|| 
|Patrick Rouble 227
|
|Manfred Janssen106
|
|Rachael Lewis 190
|
|Warren Braunberger 41
|| 
|Dave Keenan
|-
|bgcolor=whitesmoke|Vuntut Gwitchin
|
|Randall Tetlichi41
|
|Joe Tetlichi 34
|| 
|Lorraine Peter  68
|
| 
|| 
|Lorraine Peter
|-
|bgcolor=whitesmoke|Watson Lake
|| 
|Dennis Fentie521
|
|Tom Cove130
|
|Kathy Magun 174
|
| 
|| 
|Dennis Fentie
|-
|bgcolor=whitesmoke|Whitehorse Centre
|
|Vicki Durrant171
|
|Bernie Phillips218
|| 
|Todd Hardy300
|
|Mike McLarnon207
|| 
|Mike McLarnon
|-
|bgcolor=whitesmoke|Whitehorse West
|| 
|Elaine Taylor 398
|
|Dennis Schneider319
|
|Rachel Grantham 117
|
| 
|| 
|Dennis Schneider
|}

Electoral boundary changes from last election
The riding of Faro was represented by Trevor Harding (NDP). Jim McLachlan (Liberal) was elected in a by-election after Harding resigned. The riding disappeared,  absorbed into Pelly-Nisutlin.
The riding of Ross River-Southern Lakes represented by Dave Keenan (NDP) was split, with Ross River and Teslin going in Pelly-Nisutlin, the rest (Carcross and Marsh Lake) became Southern Lakes along with the portions of the Mount Lorne riding.
The Whitehorse riding of Riverside, (represented by Scott Kent (Lib) who moved to Porter Creek Centre), disappeared absorbed into Whitehorse Centre and Riverdale North.
The Whitehorse riding of Copperbelt is a new riding created by splitting Whitehorse West.
The Whitehorse riding of Porter Creek Centre is a new riding created by splitting Porter Creek North.

Member changes from last election
James R. McLachlan (Liberal) elected in a by-election in the riding of Faro after the resignation of Trevor Harding in 2000.
Dennis Fentie (NDP) defects to the Yukon Party in May 2002 and became leader one month later.
Mike McLarnon (Liberal) defects and becomes an Independent in May 2002.
Wayne Jim (Liberal) defects and becomes an Independent in May 2002.
Don Roberts (Liberal) defects and becomes an Independent in May 2002.

References

2002 elections in Canada
2002
Election
November 2002 events in Canada